Oh Ha-young (born July 19, 1996), better known by the mononym Hayoung, is a South Korean singer and actress. She is best known as a member of the South Korean girl group Apink.

Life and career

1996–2011: Early life and debut with Apink
Oh Ha-young was born on July 19, 1996, in Seoul, South Korea. During her school days, she attended Seoul Yangcheon District's Shinwol Middle School where she graduated in 2012, and School of Performing Arts Seoul where she graduated in 2015. During her seventh grade, she auditioned for Cube Entertainment where she later on became a trainee. Oh decided not to pursue college after high school to concentrate on Apink's promotions.

Oh was introduced as the third member of girl group Apink on February 21, 2011. She debuted with Apink on Mnet's M Countdown on April 21, 2011, performing their songs "I Don't Know" (몰라요) and "Wishlist", which were included on their debut EP Seven Springs of Apink.

2013–2018: Acting career, variety shows, and individual endeavors 
In 2013, Oh played the female lead in the music video for Huh Gak's song "1440". Oh has also played the female lead in Shin Bora's single "Frozen" along with B1A4's CNU, the male lead.

Aside from Apink's activities, Oh has participated in various variety and acting projects. In 2014, she began her variety appearance as MC in the variety show Weekly Idol along with Apink co-member Bomi for some episodes. In July 2014, she was featured in the music video for Jiggy Dogg's single "The Best Thing I Did". In August 2015, she was appointed as co-MC on Weekly Idol along with AOA's Mina and VIXX's N, starting from September 2. In 2016, she was cast in the female edition of the reality show Law of the Jungle filmed in Papua New Guinea. Throughout her career as a singer, besides vocal contribution to Apink's songs, Oh has ventured into songwriting: she penned the lyrics for "What a Boy Wants" (2015) and co-wrote with Eunji their duet single "It's You" (2016).

In November 2016, Oh was cast in the two-episode web drama Brother Jeongnam, which later changed title into Please Find Her and aired on KBS2 and KBS World on March 1, 2017.

In 2018, she was cast in the Naver TV Cast's six-episode sci-fi romance web drama Love, Stay in Memory, which was released from February 14 to 19. She reprised her role of female lead Yoo Ha-ri, an aspiring actress, in the sequel Love, Stay in Time, which was made available on Danaflix on June 25 and screened nationwide at Danaflix cinemas for four weeks starting on June 27, 2018.

2019–present: Debut as a solo artist with Oh! 
Oh made her official debut as a solo artist on August 21, 2019, with the release of the eponymous extended play Oh! and its accompanying title track, "Don't Make Me Laugh". The debut album peaked at number 8 on Korea's Gaon Album Chart and would go on to sell 9,083 physical copies nationwide in 2019. "Don't Make Me Laugh" failed to chart on the Gaon Digital Chart but did peak at number 97 on the Gaon Download Chart. Oh is the second Apink member after main vocalist Jung Eunji to debut officially as a soloist.

In May 2020, Oh was featured in the official soundtrack of the KBS2 drama Soul Mechanic, singing the show's leading single, "I'm Fine".

Discography

Extended plays

Singles

Songwriting credits
All song credits are adapted from the Korea Music Copyright Association's database, unless otherwise noted.

Filmography

Film

Television series

Web series

Television shows

Radio shows

References

External links

  
 
 

1996 births
Living people
21st-century South Korean actresses
Apink members
Japanese-language singers of South Korea
K-pop singers
People from Seoul
South Korean dance musicians
South Korean women pop singers
South Korean female idols
South Korean singer-songwriters
South Korean television actresses
IST Entertainment artists
Weekly Idol members
School of Performing Arts Seoul alumni
South Korean women singer-songwriters